Carl "Ray" Russell (born March 22, 1957) is an American politician, professor, self-taught meteorologist. Russell is a current member of the Watauga County commission, and former member of the North Carolina General Assembly, who represented the State's 93rd House district (comprising Watauga and Ashe Counties) from 2019 until 2021. He taught at Appalachian State University from 1991 until 2021, first in the Mathematics department and later in the Computer Science department. 

Self-taught in meteorology, Russell founded the popular regional weather website, Ray's Weather Center (RaysWeather.com). In 2016, Russell ran the entire length of the Blue Ridge Parkway to raise money for the Blue Ridge Parkway Foundation.

Education
Russell earned bachelor's degrees in computer science and religion at Freed-Hardeman College in 1979, a MS in computer science at Georgia Institute of Technology in 1985, a MS in mathematics at Memphis State University in 1982, and a Ph. D. in computer science at Georgia Institute of Technology in 1989.

Political career
Russell, a Democrat, defeated incumbent Republican Jonathan Jordan on November 6th, 2018. Russell won by a margin of 52 percent to 48 percent of Jordan.
In the 2020 Democratic Primary, Russell defeated challenger Turner Doolittle by a margin of 88 percent to 12 percent.

He was defeated for re-election in 2020 by Republican challenger Ray Pickett.

On October 4, 2022, Russell was appointed to the Watauga County Commission following the resignation of chairman John Welch.

Electoral history

2020

2018

References

Democratic Party members of the North Carolina House of Representatives
Living people
21st-century American politicians
Appalachian State University faculty
1957 births